The 1930 Connecticut gubernatorial election was held on November 4, 1930. Democratic nominee Wilbur Lucius Cross defeated Republican nominee Ernest E. Rogers with 49.91% of the vote.

General election

Candidates
Major party candidates
Wilbur Lucius Cross, Democratic
Ernest E. Rogers, Republican

Other candidates
Jasper McLevy, Socialist
Robert S. Kling, Communist

Results

References

1930
Connecticut